El Tío Disparate  (English language:The Silly Uncle) is a 1978  Argentine comedy musical film directed by Palito Ortega and written Juan Carlos Mesa. It stars Palito Ortega and Carlos Balá.

Cast
Palito Ortega
Carlos Balá  (as Carlitos Balá)
Javier Portales
Iris Láinez
Daniel Miglioranza
Gloria Raines
José Díaz Lastra
Horacio O'Connor
Alicia Zanca
Osvaldo Capiaggi
Matilde Mur
Gustavo Rey

External links
http://www.imdb.com/title/tt0194480/
 El Tío Disparate at cinenacional.com 

1978 films
Argentine musical comedy films
1970s Spanish-language films
1970s musical comedy films
Films set in Buenos Aires
Films shot in Buenos Aires
1978 comedy films
1970s Argentine films